Iso was a chain of Danish supermarkets which was incorporated into the SuperBest chain in 2007. In 2007 the chain owned 12 stores in Copenhagen and Northern Zealand.

References

Supermarkets of Denmark
1937 establishments in Denmark
2007 disestablishments in Denmark